Coney may refer to:

Places
 Côney, a river in eastern France
 Coney, Georgia, an unincorporated community in the United States
 Coney Island (disambiguation)

People
 Dean Coney (born 1963), English footballer
 Hykiem Coney (1982–2006), American anti-gang activist
 Jeremy Coney (born 1952), New Zealand cricketer
 Malachy Coney (fl. 1989–2011), Irish comic writer
 Michael G. Coney (1932–2005), English science fiction writer
 Sandra Coney (born 1944), New Zealand feminist and women's health campaigner
 Te'Von Coney (born 1997), American football player
 Theodore Edward Coneys (1882–1967), American murderer
 Coney Reyes (born 1953), Filipina actress
 Amy Coney Barrett (born 1972), American lawyer

Animals
 another name for the  European rabbit
 Cephalopholis fulva, a species of fish
 Cuban coney, an extinct species of rodent
 Rock hyrax, called a coney in the King James Bible

Food
 Coney Island hot dog
 White hot, a hot dog occasionally called a Coney

Ships
 , a United States Navy tug in commission from 1917 to 1919

See also
 Cony (surname)
 Cony, a white rabbit character in Line chatting app
 CNY (disambiguation)
 Kony (disambiguation)

Animal common name disambiguation pages